Fukuoka Futures Exchange (FFE) was a futures exchange founded 1893, based in Fukuoka, Japan. It was absorbed by Kansai Commodities Exchange, based in Ôsaka, and no longer exists. Trading was conducted at six specified session times through the day. At each session, a price was established for each contract month in each commodity. Daily price movement limits apply, including open position limits for members and customers. There were no position limits for hedging.

Commodities traded 

 Broiler chicken
 Corn
 Non-GMO IOM soybeans
 IOM soybeans
 Redbeans (Azuki)
 Soybean meal

See also 

 List of futures exchanges in Japan
 Security (finance)

References 

Fukuoka